Ivan Ivanovich may refer to:

 Ivan Ivanovich (Vostok programme), a mannequin used in testing the Russian Vostok spacecraft in preparation for its crewed missions
 SuitSat, a retired Russian Orlan spacesuit with a radio transmitter mounted on its helmet deployed as an OSCAR satellite in 2006
 Иван Иванович, the Russian equivalent of "John Doe"
 Ivan Ivanovitch, an English-language idiom of the 19th century

People 
 Ivan II of Moscow (1326–1359), Grand Prince of Moscow and Grand Prince of Vladimir from 1353
 Ivan the Young (1458–1490), eldest son and heir of Ivan III of Russia
 Ivan V of Ryazan (1496–1533 or 1534), the last nominally independent ruler of Ryazan
 Tsarevich Ivan Ivanovich of Russia (1554–1581), second son and heir apparent of Ivan IV (the Terrible)
 Ivan Ivanovitch (fencer), French Olympic fencer

See also
 Ivan (disambiguation)
 Ivanovich
 Ivanović

Ivanovich, Ivan